Mythos is a worldview-based traditional story or body of mythology. Mythos may also refer to:

Aircraft
Kohl Mythos, a German observation ultralight aircraft

Automotive
Ferrari Mythos, a concept car

Film and television
Mythos, a character in the TV series Rounin
Mythos (film), a multipart documentary on Joseph Campbell

Food and drink
Mythos Brewery, makers of Mythos beer
Mythos (restaurant), at the Universal Orlando Resort

Games and comics
Mythos (card game), an Origins-Award-winning card game by Chaosium released in 1996
Mythos (comics), a Greek comic book with elements of Greek mythology and history

Mythos Games, a defunct British video game developer company
Mythos Island, a fictional place in the Disney comic series Mythos Island
Mythos (Marvel Comics), a series of Marvel comic books
Mythos (video game), a 2011 computer game by HanbitSoft Inc. & T3 Entertainment
Mythos, the unreleased North American version of the 2011 game, in development by Redbana Corporation

Literature
Mythos (Aristotle), the term used by Aristotle in his Poetics for the plot of an Athenian tragedy
Mythos (book), a retelling of a number of Ancient Greek myths by Stephen Fry
Mythos (journal), a journal published by the University of Palermo since the 1990s
Mythos-Magazin, a magazine published by the University of Düsseldorf since 2005
MythOS, a science-fiction novel by Kelly McCullough

Music

Mythos (band), a German krautrock band (founded 1969)
Mythos (Mythos album) (1972)
Mythos (musical project), a Canadian music project (founded 1996)
its album Mythos (1998)
"Mythos", a song by Jo Blankenburg from Immediate Music's Themes for Orchestra & Choir 3
Remastered Tracks Rockman Zero: Mythos, a soundtrack of the Mega Man Zero series
Mythos (Mario Pavone album) (2002)
 Mythos  (Soul Embraced album), a 2013 album by the Christian metal band Soul Embraced

See also
 
 Methos
 Myth (disambiguation)
 Mỹ Tho
 Mythology (disambiguation)
 Mythopoeia
 Mythus (disambiguation)